is a Japanese ice dancer. She currently represents her home country in partnership with her husband Tim Koleto, with whom she is the 2020 NHK Trophy champion and a four-time Japanese national champion. Together, they also earned a bronze medal from the team event at the 2022 Winter Olympics.

She previously represented Italy with Andrea Fabbri, with whom she won five international medals, including silver at the 2015 CS Ice Challenge.

Personal life 
Komatsubara was born on July 28, 1992, in Tokyo. She speaks Japanese, English, and Italian.  She is vegan.

Komatsubara and Tim Koleto began a relationship after partnering on-ice in 2016, and they married in January 2017 in Okayama, Japan. Koleto adopted Komatsubara's surname upon his becoming a Japanese citizen in 2020, feeling that "to be Japanese but ask my wife to change to a foreign surname I thought was quite strange."

Career

Early years 
Komatsubara began learning to skate in 2001. She competed for Japan with Kokoro Mizutani in the 2009–10 and 2010–11 seasons. In 2010, the two received a pair of Junior Grand Prix assignments. They were coached by Nozomi Watanabe in Yokohama, Japan.

During the next two seasons, Komatsubara skated with Kaoru Tsuji. Their partnership ended in 2013. After a pause, she decided to continue skating and resumed training under Rie Arikawa in Okayama.

Partnership with Fabbri

2014–15 season 
Komatsubara teamed up with Italy's Andrea Fabbri. The two were coached by Barbara Fusar-Poli in Milan from December 2013. They represented Italy on the senior level. Their international debut came in October 2014 at the Ondrej Nepela Trophy, a Challenger Series (CS) event where they finished 6th. After winning bronze medals at the Santa Claus Cup and Italian Championships, they were sent to the 2015 European Championships in Stockholm, where they placed 23rd. The two ended their season with gold at the Bavarian Open.

2015–16 season 
In 2015–16, Komatsubara/Fabbri took bronze at the Lombardia Trophy and then appeared at two Challenger Series events, winning silver at the 2015 Ice Challenge. After obtaining another silver medal, at the 2015 Santa Claus Cup, they repeated as national bronze medalists and went on to compete at the 2016 European Championships in Bratislava, where they finished 21st. They were coached by Fusar-Poli and Stefano Caruso in Milan, Italy.

Komatsubara and Fabbri ended their partnership in April 2016.

Partnership with Koleto

2016–17 season 
Komatsubara teamed up with Timothy Koleto following a tryout in Milan in April 2016. They decided to train together in Milan under Barbara Fusar-Poli. They received the bronze medal at the 2016–17 Japan Championships in December 2016.

2017–18 season 
Making their international debut for Japan, Komatsubara/Koleto placed 8th at the CS Lombardia Trophy in September 2017. They finished tenth at their only Grand Prix assignment, the 2017 NHK Trophy. The two won the silver medal in December at the 2017–18 Japan Championships. In late January, they placed tenth at the 2018 Four Continents Championships. In early February, they placed fourth at the 2018 Toruń Cup.

2018–19 season 
In March 2018, Komatsubara/Koleto announced that they had moved to Montreal, Quebec, Canada, to train under Marie-France Dubreuil, Patrice Lauzon, and Romain Haguenauer. They won bronze at both of their ISU Challenger Series events, the 2018 CS Asian Open Trophy and 2018 CS US International Classic. They then competed at two Grand Prix assignments, placing eighth at the 2018 NHK Trophy and eighth at the 2018 Rostelecom Cup. 

Following the Rostelecom Cup, the team moved to train in Japan (coached by Rie Arikawa) in order for Koleto to meet a residency requirement for a future citizenship application. They won their first ice dance title at the 2018-19 Japan Championships in December 2018. They placed ninth at the 2019 Four Continents Championships after placing ninth in both segments.  Komatsubara/Koleto represented Japan at their first World Championships, held in Saitama, where they placed twenty-first in the rhythm dance, missing the free dance by one ordinal.

To conclude the season, they participated in the 2019 World Team Trophy as part of Team Japan, which won the silver medal, though Komatsubara/Koleto placed sixth of sixth competitors in each of their segments.  Komatsubara served as the Japanese team captain.

2019–20 season 
Initially scheduled to begin the season at the 2019 CS Autumn Classic International, Komatsubara/Koleto withdrew early in the preseason as a result of Komatsubara having sustained multiple concussions that necessitated time away from training.  They later made their season debut at a different Challenger, the 2019 CS Asian Open, where they finished ninth.  On the Grand Prix, they were tenth out of ten teams at the 2019 Cup of China and then withdrew from the 2019 NHK Trophy.

Returning to competition at the 2019–20 Japan Championships, they won their second consecutive national title.  Komatsubara/Koleto finished eleventh at the 2020 Four Continents Championships. They were also assigned to compete at the World Championships in Montreal, but these were cancelled as a result of the coronavirus pandemic.

2020–21 season 
With the pandemic continuing to affect international travel, the ISU opted to base the Grand Prix primarily on geographic location, and Komatsubara/Koleto were assigned to compete at the 2020 NHK Trophy in a field consisting of only three Japanese dance teams, including the newly debuted pairing of former national champion Kana Muramoto and former Olympic medalist singles skater Daisuke Takahashi. The event occurred a week after Koleto successfully obtained Japanese citizenship, making the team eligible to represent Japan at the Winter Olympics, and he said it was "great to share this moment with the Japanese audience." They placed first in the rhythm dance by over six points. Winning the free dance as well, they took the title, the first Japanese dance team to win the NHK Trophy in its history.

Competing at the 2020–21 Japan Championships, Komatsubara/Koleto placed first in the rhythm dance, four points ahead of Muramoto/Takahashi.  They won the free dance by almost twenty points, with both the silver and bronze medalists making serious errors, and took their third consecutive national title.  They were named as Japan's representatives to the 2021 World Championships in Stockholm.  They placed nineteenth, making the free dance for the first time. Komatsubara/Koleto's result qualified a berth for a Japanese dance team at the 2022 Winter Olympics.

Komatsubara/Koleto finished the season at the 2021 World Team Trophy, where they placed fifth in both of their segments of the competition, and Team Japan won the bronze medal.

2021–22 season 
In preparing their programs for the Olympic season, Komatsubara and Koleto briefly contemplated a Japanese theme for their rhythm dance but opted against it because Koleto felt "it could be difficult for me as a Caucasian man to skate to a Japanese style. How can I respectfully portray my country that I care so much about in a way that doesn’t feel like a Halloween costume, in a way that doesn’t feel like a joke." Instead, they chose a free dance to John Williams' score for Memoirs of a Geisha, as Komatsubara felt "there were pieces of our story, pieces of our road, all inside of this music in this movie."

Komatsubara/Koleto made their season debut at the 2021 Skate America, where they placed sixth. At their second event on the Grand Prix, the 2021 NHK Trophy, they finished in seventh place, 7.30 points behind domestic rivals Muramoto/Takahashi. Koleto said afterwards, "there were a lot of things that didn’t go as we wanted them," but expressed satisfaction at having achieved new personal bests. He said their goal was to score over 180 points at the national championships.

The 2021–22 Japan Championships, the final national qualification event for the 2022 Winter Olympics, pitted Komatsubara/Koleto against Muramoto/Takahashi for the second time that season. They won the rhythm dance, and finished second in the free dance to win the title overall, and were subsequently named to the Japanese Olympic team.

Komatsubara/Koleto began the 2022 Winter Olympics as the Japanese entries in the rhythm dance segment of the Olympic team event. They placed seventh in the segment, securing four points for Team Japan. They finished fifth of the five dance teams in the free segment, taking six points for Japan.  The Japanese team ultimately won the bronze medal, making the podium for the first time in the history of the team event.  In the dance event, Komatsubara/Koleto finished twenty-second in the rhythm dance.

2022–23 season 
After placing seventh at the 2022 CS U.S. Classic, Komatsubara/Koleto were seventh as well at the 2022 Skate Canada International. They finished ninth at the 2022 NHK Trophy. 

Komatsubara/Koleto won the silver medal at the 2022–23 Japan Championships, finishing behind Muramoto/Takahashi. Komatsubara said "We are disappointed about the result, but we had a lot of fun."

At the 2023 Four Continents Championships, Komatsubara/Koleto finished sixth in the rhythm dance and seventh overall, remaining ahead of their domestic rivals in both segments. They then finished fourth at the International Challenge Cup.

Programs

With Koleto

With Fabbri

With Mizutani

Competitive highlights 
GP: Grand Prix; CS: Challenger Series; JGP: Junior Grand Prix

With Koleto for Japan

With Fabbri for Italy

With Tsuji for Japan

With Mizutani for Japan

Women's singles

Detailed results

Senior results

With Koleto for Japan

With Fabbri for Italy

With Tsuji for Japan

Junior results

With Tsuji for Japan

With Mizutani for Japan

References

External links 
 
 

1992 births
Japanese female ice dancers
Living people
Sportspeople from Tokyo
Figure skaters at the 2022 Winter Olympics
Olympic figure skaters of Japan
Olympic bronze medalists for Japan
Medalists at the 2022 Winter Olympics
Olympic medalists in figure skating